Tylenol is a brand of medication, advertised for reducing pain, reducing fever, and relieving the symptoms of allergies, cold, cough, headache, and influenza. The active ingredient of its original flagship product is paracetamol (known in the United States, Canada, and various other countries as acetaminophen), an analgesic and antipyretic. Like the words paracetamol and acetaminophen, the brand name Tylenol is derived from a chemical name for the compound, N-acetyl-para-aminophenol (APAP). The brand name is owned by McNeil Consumer Healthcare, a subsidiary of Johnson & Johnson.

Medical uses
The active ingredient in Tylenol is paracetamol, a widely used over-the-counter analgesic (pain reliever) and antipyretic (fever reducer). Formulations with additional active ingredients intended to target specific applications are sold under the Tylenol brand. These can include codeine as co-codamol, dextromethorphan, methocarbamol, guaifenesin, pseudoephedrine, caffeine, diphenhydramine, chlorpheniramine and phenylephrine.

History
The brand was introduced in 1955 by McNeil Laboratories, a family-owned pharmaceutical manufacturer. Two brothers took over the company from their father that year, and one of them subsequently learned about paracetamol, which was not on the U.S. market at that time. To avoid competing with aspirin, they marketed it as a product to reduce fever in children, packaging it like a red fire truck with the slogan, "for little hotheads". The brand name Tylenol and the United States Adopted Name acetaminophen were generated by McNeil from the chemical name of the drug, N-acetyl-para-aminophenol (APAP).

In 1955, McNeil introduced Tylenol Elixer for children, the first aspirin-free pain reliever.

Johnson & Johnson bought McNeil in 1959, and one year later the drug was made available over the counter.

Recalls

1982 Chicago Tylenol murders

On September 29, 1982, a "Tylenol scare" began when the first of seven individuals died in the Chicago metropolitan area after ingesting Extra Strength Tylenol that had been deliberately contaminated with cyanide. Within a week, the company pulled 31 million bottles of tablets back from retailers, making it one of the first major product recalls in American history.

As a result of the crisis, all Tylenol capsules were discontinued, as were capsules of other brand names. Retained by McNeil's president, new product consultant Martin Calle of management strategist Calle & Company conceived the world's first tamper-resistant gelatin-enrobed capsule called "Tylenol Gelcaps", which proved to resuscitate the 92% of capsule-segment sales lost to the recall. The tamper-resistant, triple-sealed safety containers were placed on the shelves of retailers ten weeks after the withdrawal, and other manufacturers followed suit. The Tylenol murderer was never found, and a  reward offered by Johnson & Johnson remained unclaimed as of 2013.

Before the poisonings, Tylenol brands held around 35% of the US market for acetaminophen and in the immediate aftermath, fell to 8%. Within a year sales had rebounded to the prior levels. J&J's handling of the crisis has been widely cited as an example of optimal crisis management.

These events led to the widespread use of tamper resistance packaging of drugs by drug companies, to the 1982 passage of a US federal law making tampering a crime, and to legislation in 1989 requiring tamper-proof packaging.

2010 Tylenol recalls
On January 15, 2010, a voluntary recall of several hundred batches of popular medicines was announced, including Benadryl, Motrin, Rolaids, Simply Sleep, St. Joseph Aspirin, and Tylenol. The recall was due to complaints of a musty smell suspected to be due to contamination of the packaging with the chemical 2,4,6-tribromoanisole. The full health effects of 2,4,6-tribromoanisole are not known but no serious events have been documented in medical literature. The recall came 20 months after McNeil first began receiving and investigating consumer complaints about moldy-smelling bottles of Tylenol Arthritis Relief caplets, according to the U.S. Food and Drug Administration (FDA). The recall included 53 million bottles of over-the-counter products, involving lots in the Americas, the United Arab Emirates, and Fiji.

Children's Tylenol

On April 30, 2010, another recall was issued for 40 products including liquid infant and children's pain relievers Tylenol and Motrin, and allergy medications Zyrtec and Benadryl. An FDA report said its inspectors found thick dust and grime covering certain equipment, a hole in the ceiling, and duct tape-covered pipes at the Fort Washington, Pennsylvania, facility that made 40 products recalled. New testing regulations were enacted after the recall to ensure product quality and safety.

On May 5, 2010, the FDA confirmed that the bacterium found at the Johnson & Johnson plant that made the recalled Children's Tylenol was Burkholderia cepacia, a bacterium often resistant to common antibiotics. The bacteria were found on the outside of certain product-containing drums, but not in the finished product. The CDC has stated that Burkholderia cepacia is not likely to cause health problems for those with healthy immune systems, but those with weaker ones and those with chronic lung diseases, such as cystic fibrosis, could be more susceptible to infection.

Questions about safety during pregnancy
A 2014 study found that "Maternal acetaminophen use during pregnancy is associated with a higher risk for HKDs and ADHD-like behaviors in children."
The study was the first of its kind, and concluded that, "because the exposure and outcome are frequent, these results are of public health relevance but further investigations are needed." 

In September 2021, the United States Food and Drug Administration released a statement amid growing concern about the potential impact of Tylenol during pregnancy, and concluded that the studies were "too limited to make any recommendations based on these studies at this time. Because of this 
uncertainty, the use of pain medicines during pregnancy should be carefully considered. 
We urge pregnant women to always discuss all medicines with their health care 
professionals before using them."

Advertising

Tylenol has many different advertisement approaches. One of these advertisement campaigns focuses on "getting you back to normal", whereas the other commercials focus on Tylenol's current slogan, "Feel better, Tylenol". In the "Feel better, Tylenol" commercials, Tylenol places emphasis on the importance of sleep; various people are seen sleeping in this commercial while a voiceover describes how sleep can help repair and heal the human body during times of aches and pains. In the "getting you back to normal" commercial, Tylenol places more emphasis on helping its consumers get back to their daily routines; many different people are shown first experiencing headaches and other sorts of body pain, where a voiceover then states that Tylenol Rapid Release can help rid aches and pains; the various people are then shown enjoying their everyday lives, and are seen as "back to normal".

In an older commercial from 1986, Tylenol emphasized that it is the drug that American hospitals trust the most. In this ad, Susan Sullivan told the consumer that Tylenol was a drug that could be trusted by Americans since many doctors also trusted it; she went on to state that doctors prescribed Tylenol four times more often than other leading pain relieving drugs combined.

A form that contains dextromethorphan, pseudoephedrine, acetaminophen, and chlorpheniramine, is sold as Cotylenol.

Countries
, the "Tylenol" brand was used in Australia Brazil, Canada, China, Egypt, Kuwait, Lebanon, Mexico, Myanmar, Netherlands, Oman, Paraguay, the Philippines, South Africa, South Korea, Switzerland, Taiwan, Thailand, the United States, Uruguay, Venezuela, and Vietnam.

See also 

 Paracetamol brand names

References

External links

 
 
 

Analgesics
Antipyretics
Johnson & Johnson brands
Products introduced in 1955